Klaus Graf (born 21 July 1969) is a German professional racing driver. He is the son of rally driver Peter Graf. He lives in the United States while competing in the American Le Mans Series. He resulted LMP1 class champion in 2012, and runner-up in 2010 and 2011.

Racing career

Born in Dornhan, Graf has won championships and races in several road racing series. In 2004, he raced part-time in NASCAR Nextel Cup for BAM Racing. He competed in one race at Infineon Raceway finishing 17th; however, he attempted two other races during the year. He attempted 8 races for the same team in 2007 but did not qualify for any of them. In 2005 he won the Trans-Am Series Driver's Championship, becoming the first Trans Am champion born outside the United States since David Hobbs in 1983.

Klaus raced for Muscle Milk Pickett Racing in the American Le Mans Series. His best finishes in the 2010 season were an LMP2 class win at the 12 Hours of Sebring sharing with team owner Greg Pickett and Sascha Maassen, and overall race wins (and LMP class) at the Northeast Grand Prix sharing with Pickett, and at the Grand Prix of Mosport sharing with Romain Dumas.

In 2011, Graf collected further victories at Long Beach, Mosport, Mid-Ohio and Road America in the team's Lola-Aston Martin. For 2012, Graf returned to the team and drove together with Lucas Luhr in a new HPD ARX-03a for the entire ALMS season.

Graf won the 2012 and 2013 ALMS LMP1 driver's championships with codriver Lucas Luhr.

Racing record

24 Hours of Le Mans results

Complete Porsche Supercup results
(key) (Races in bold indicate pole position) (Races in italics indicate fastest lap)

† — Did not finish the race, but was classified as he completed over 90% of the race distance.

‡ — Guest driver – Not eligible for points.

NASCAR
(key) (Bold – Pole position awarded by qualifying time. Italics – Pole position earned by points standings or practice time. * – Most laps led.)

Nextel Cup Series

ARCA Re/Max Series
(key) (Bold – Pole position awarded by qualifying time. Italics – Pole position earned by points standings or practice time. * – Most laps led.)

Complete WeatherTech SportsCar Championship results
(key) (Races in bold indicate pole position) (Races in italics indicate fastest lap)

References

External links

 Klaus Graf at the American Le Mans Series official website
 Klaus Graf at Driver Database
 Klaus Graf at Racing Sports Cars
 Klaus Graf at Race Database
 CytoSport
 

1969 births
Living people
People from Rottweil (district)
Sportspeople from Freiburg (region)
German expatriates in the United States
Racing drivers from Baden-Württemberg
German racing drivers
NASCAR drivers
American Le Mans Series drivers
Trans-Am Series drivers
24 Hours of Le Mans drivers
Porsche Supercup drivers
Blancpain Endurance Series drivers
24 Hours of Daytona drivers
WeatherTech SportsCar Championship drivers
24 Hours of Spa drivers
ARCA Menards Series drivers
G+M Escom Motorsport drivers
Walter Lechner Racing drivers
Charouz Racing System drivers
Rowe Racing drivers
Rocketsports Racing drivers
Nürburgring 24 Hours drivers
Porsche Carrera Cup Germany drivers